People's Commissariat for Finance may refer ro:

 People's Commissariat for Finance of the USSR
 People's Commissariat for Finance of the RSFSR
 People's Commissariat for Finance of the Ukrainian SSR
 People's Commissariat for Finance of the BSSR
 People's Commissariat for Finance of the GSSR
 People's Commissariat for Finance of the KSSR